Palavrantiga is a Christian rock band formed in 2004 when its members were the band of Heloisa Rosa. With it, members of the quartet released three albums. In 2008 they released their first album the group, Vol.1 EP Palavrantiga.

In 2011, the band received the first nomination Troféu Promessas in Revelation category. Soon the project will be released Uma Noite em Recife (One Night in Recife), recorded in 2011 and released on CD and DVD.

Band members
Marcos Almeida (lead vocals, guitar, keyboard)
Lucas Fonseca (drums)
Felipe Vieira (bass)
Josias Alexandre (guitar)

Discography

Studio albums
2008: Palavrantiga - Volume 1
2010: Esperar é Caminhar
2012: Sobre o Mesmo Chão

Live albums
2012: Uma Noite em Recife

References

Brazilian gospel musical groups
Brazilian Christian rock groups
Musical groups established in 2008